Scott Cross is an American producer, actor, writer, and entrepreneur. He is co-founder of the Vail Film Festival in Vail, Colorado, co-founder of the Los Cabos International Film Festival in Los Cabos, Mexico, and co-president of Cross Pictures, a film and television production company. The Vail Film Festival has been named "one of the top ten destination film festivals in the world," according to MovieMaker magazine.

Background
Scott was born in Cape Town, South Africa and raised in New York, United States. He graduated from the University of California at Berkeley with a Bachelor of Arts in Social Anthropology. He resides in Los Angeles, California.

Career
In 2004, Scott co-founded the Colorado Film Institute and the Vail Film Festival to serve as a platform to educate aspiring filmmakers, showcase unique artistic visions, and to ensure that powerful, creative independent films are seen by the movie-going public.

In 2005, Scott helped bring LA's acclaimed Hotel Café, one of the music industry's premier venues for singer/songwriters, to the Vail Film Festival, a partnership that continues to this day. Hotel Café musicians include Ingrid Michaelson, Sara Bareilles, Cary Brothers, Josh Radin, Joe Purdy, Buddy, Jay Nash, Laura Jansen, Holly Conlan, Meiko, and more.

In 2006, Scott helped secure the Vail Film Festival partnership with Film Your Issue, a national issue film contest, in partnership with the American Democracy Project, featuring 30 to 60-second films. Thirty-five semi-finalists were named by the competition, and five winners were selected through a combination of a jury including Walter Cronkite, Brian Williams, then Senator Barack Obama, George Clooney, Philip Seymour Hoffman and others. The winning films from the Film Your Issue contest were screened at the Vail Film Festival.

In 2007, Scott initiated and oversaw a partnership between the Vail Film Festival and Product Red. The Vail Film Festival became the only film festival to partner with Bono and Bobby Shriver's Product Red, an initiative to raise money for the Global Fund to fight AIDS, Tuberculosis and Malaria in Africa.
Together, Product Red and the Vail Film Festival launched the RED Vision Contest, a worldwide film competition created by Scott. The winning films were screened at the Vail Film Festival.
The Vail Film Festival donated 25% of pass sales to the Global Fund.

By 2007 Scott and his brother Sean Cross had grown the Vail Film Festival to become one of the top ten destination film festivals in the world, according to MovieMaker Magazine.

The Vail Film Festival has screened groundbreaking independent and studio films, including Before Sunset, Forgetting Sarah Marshall, Snow Cake, The Wendell Baker Story, House of D, the directorial debut of David Duchovny, and recognized some of the film industry's most talented actors and filmmakers, including legendary producer Edward Pressman (Wall Street, Reversal of Fortune, Hoffa, American Psycho, Bad Lieutenant, Thank You For Smoking, Fur), comedy icon Harold Ramis (Stripes, Caddyshack, Animal House, Ghostbusters, Groundhog Day), Luke Wilson (The Royal Tenenbaums), Kevin Smith (Clerks, Chasing Amy), Michelle Monaghan (Gone Baby Gone), Aaron Paul (Breaking Bad), Tim Daly (Wings), Jeremy Davies (Lost), Olivia Wilde (House, Tron: Legacy), Hayden Panettiere (Heroes), Jesse Eisenberg (Zombieland, Adventureland), Sophia Bush (One Tree Hill), Adrian Grenier (Entourage), Zach Braff (Scrubs, Garden State), Jane Seymour (Dr. Quinn, Medicine Woman), Josh Lucas (Sweet Home Alabama), Kate Bosworth (Win a Date with Tad Hamilton), Michael Imperioli (The Sopranos), Fred Schepisi (Roxanne, Six Degrees of Separation), Allison Janney (The West Wing, Juno), and Tate Taylor (The Help).

In 2012, Scott co-founded the Cabo International Film Festival (Originally named Baja International Film Festival). The inaugural edition took place in Los Cabos, Mexico November 14–17, 2012 with Two-time Academy-award nominee Edward Norton as the official festival adviser. Other notable guests in attendance included Academy-award winner Octavia Spencer, Academy-award winner Melissa Leo, Academy-award nominated actor Virginia Madsen, Emmy-winning actor Allison Janney, actor Josh Lucas, actor Diego Luna, actor Gael García Bernal, Academy-award nominated actor Matt Dillon, Academy-award nominated director Alejandro González Iñárritu, Academy-award nominated director Tate Taylor, multiple award-winning director and past president of the Directors Guild of America Michael Apted and more.

References

External links

 Scott Cross Product Red interview
 Photos of Scott Cross at Vail Film Festival
 Denver Post, Scott Cross quote
 Scott Cross interview on PlumTV
 Los Cabos International Film Festival
 Vail Film Festival

Year of birth missing (living people)
Living people
American male actors
American film producers
Film festival founders
Male actors from Cape Town
University of California, Berkeley alumni
South African emigrants to the United States
Writers from Cape Town